Achmad Hulaefi (born October 14, 1989) is a retired wushu taolu athlete from Indonesia.

Career

Junior 
Hulaefi made his international debut at the 2005 Asian Junior Wushu Championships where he won a silver medal in daoshu. A year later, he won the bronze medal in daoshu at the 2006 World Junior Wushu Championships.

Senior 
2011 Southeast Asian Games where he won the gold medal in daoshu and gunshu combined and a bronze medal in changquan. At the 2013 Southeast Asian Games, he was a double gold medalist in both events, and also won a silver medal in changquan. He also won a gold medal at the 2013 Islamic Solidarity Games shortly after. Two years later at the 2015 Southeast Asian Games, he won a gold and silver medal in his weapon specialties. At the 2017 Southeast Asian Games, he only won the silver medal in daoshu and gunshu combined, but later that year, he won his first medals at the 2017 World Wushu Championships which included silver medals in changquan and gunshu. A year later at the 2018 Asian Games, he won the bronze medal in men's daoshu and gunshu. He subsequently retired from competition.

Personal life 
Hulaefi married teammate Lindswell Kwok shortly after the 2018 Asian Games in December of the same year.

See also 

 List of Asian Games medalists in wushu

References

External links 
 Achmad Hualefi on Instagram
 Achmad Hulaefi on YouTube

1989 births
Living people
Sportspeople from Jakarta
Indonesian wushu practitioners
Wushu practitioners at the 2014 Asian Games
Wushu practitioners at the 2018 Asian Games
Asian Games bronze medalists for Indonesia
Asian Games medalists in wushu
Medalists at the 2018 Asian Games
Competitors at the 2011 Southeast Asian Games
Competitors at the 2013 Southeast Asian Games
Competitors at the 2015 Southeast Asian Games
Competitors at the 2017 Southeast Asian Games
Southeast Asian Games gold medalists for Indonesia
Southeast Asian Games silver medalists for Indonesia
Southeast Asian Games bronze medalists for Indonesia
Southeast Asian Games medalists in wushu